The Skretting Aquaculture Research Centre A/S (Skretting ARC), established in 1989, is the central R&D unit for the global fish and shrimp feed concern. Skretting is owned by Nutreco N.V., whose head office is in Amersfoort, The Netherlands. Skretting ARC's main objective is to provide research and technical support regarding fish and shrimp feed. Skretting ARC has about 60 manyears of which about 45% have degrees corresponding to MSc or PhD level. It has an international staff representing 13 nationalities. It performs research for all feed companies within Skretting in Europe, North & South America, Asia and Australia. Skretting ARC’  is a legal entity owned 100% by Skretting AS.

Core competencies 
Skretting ARC's core competencies are within fish and shrimp nutrition and health, raw feed materials, feed safety & quality and feed manufacturing processes. Skretting ARC's facilities include an extensive research station with hatchery and land based tanks with both fresh and seawater trial facilities, a pilot plant for test feed production and innovative process trials and a well-equipped modern laboratory. The research station is designed for running trials with salmonids through all life stages with different water qualities (temperature and salinity). Facilities are also adapted for running trials with cod after metamorphosis. Main facilities are located within the vicinity of Stavanger, however Skretting also has a trout facility in Italy and is working towards a facility in Asia. Skretting ARC collaborates with several universities and institutes around the world.

Projects 
Skretting ARC has participated in several Norwegian Research Council and EU-funded research projects over the years. Its researchers have been authors or co-authors of several scientific publications. Some examples of EU projects are:
 SELFDOTT (Self-sustained Aquaculture and Domestication of Bluefin Tuna Thunnus thynnus)
 AQUAMAX Sustainable Aquafeeds to Maximise the Health Benefits of Farmed Fish for Consumers
 GLIP (Grain Legumes Integrated Programme)

References

External links 
 Skretting
 Nutreco

Fisheries and aquaculture research institutes
Research institutes established in 1989